Frank Alesci (born December 12, 1986 in Ridgewood, New York) is an American soccer player currently playing for Jersey Express S.C. in the USL Premier Development League.

Career

College and amateur
Alesci attended La Salle Academy, and was standout player for two noted club teams, B.W. Gottschee and Red Storm, before going on to play three years of college soccer at Long Island University. He was an All-Northeast Conference First Team selection as a rookie in 2007, the only freshman to be honored on NEC First Team that year, but was forced to sit out his sophomore season after tearing his anterior cruciate ligament.

He transferred to Queens College, City University of New York prior to his junior year in 2009 and played two more seasons there, finishing second on the team in goals as a senior.

During his college years Alesci also played extensively in the USL Premier Development League, two seasons with Bakersfield Brigade, two seasons with the Brooklyn Knights and one year with Newark Ironbound Express. He was named to the Premier Development League's all-league team in 2010 while playing for Newark.

Professional
Undrafted out of college, Alesci turned professional on March 7, 2011 when he signed with USL Professional Division club Rochester Rhinos. He made his professional debut on May 20, 2011, as a second-half substitute in a 0-0 tie with Orlando City, and scored his first professional goal on May 30 in a 2-1 loss to F.C. New York.

References

External links
 Rochester Rhinos profile
 Long Island bio
 Infosport profile

1986 births
Living people
Bakersfield Brigade players
Brooklyn Knights players
Jersey Express S.C. players
Rochester New York FC players
USL League Two players
USL Championship players
Sportspeople from Queens, New York
Soccer players from New York City
Association football midfielders
American soccer players